César Daneliczen (born 16 August 1962) is a Brazilian former cyclist. He competed in the team time trial at the 1988 Summer Olympics.

References

1962 births
Living people
Brazilian male cyclists
Brazilian road racing cyclists
Olympic cyclists of Brazil
Cyclists at the 1988 Summer Olympics
Place of birth missing (living people)